Albaraka Türk Katılım Bankası A.Ş. was founded in 1984 in Istanbul Turkey by Dr. Sami Hasan Ahmed Homoud the CEO of Al Baraka Banking Group and commenced its commercial activities in 1985 as Albaraka Türk Özel Finans Kurumu. It is known as the first Participation Bank in Turkey. The ownership structure is composed of 66.51% by foreign investment parties, 12.91% by local parties and 20.57% is held by IPO.

In addition to Albaraka Türk offering financial services to its customers through its branches, they also act as Anadolu Sigorta and Anadolu Hayat Emeklilik agencies, selling Insurance Policies, Private Pension Plans and other services related to their domain.

Recently Albaraka Türk in cooperation with Anadolu Hayat Emeklilik announced that they will offer Private Pension Plans in which the funds collected will be used in Sharia compliant non-interest Financial Instruments. This product especially aims towards the more sensitive Islamic customers. 

Albaraka Türk Katılım Bankası has profit and loss partnership, consumer finance, credit card islamic license.

Ownership structure
As of 30 September 2010 the ownership structure is as shown in the table

References

External links

 Albaraka Türk Katılım Bank Islamic licenses

 Albaraka Türk official web site (in Turkish)
 Albaraka Türk official web site (in English)
 Albaraka Türk Finance Portal (in Turkish)
 Sorun (Çözelim) (English: Ask (and we'll solve)) (in Turkish)

Banks established in 1984
Banks of Turkey
Islamic banks
Participation banks
Companies listed on the Istanbul Stock Exchange
Companies based in Istanbul